This is a list of law schools in Turkey.

Akdeniz University, Faculty of Law
Anadolu University, Faculty of Law
Ankara University, Law School
Ankara Yıldırım Beyazıt University, Faculty of Law
Atatürk University, Faculty of Law
Bahçeşehir University, Faculty of Law
Baskent University, Faculty of Law
Beykent University, Faculty of Law
Bilkent University, Faculty of Law
Çukurova University, Faculty of Law
Dicle University, Faculty of Law
Erzincan Binali Yıldırım University, Faculty of Law
Galatasaray University, Faculty of Law
Gazi University, Faculty of Law
Hacettepe University, Faculty of Law
Istanbul Aydin University, Faculty of Law
Istanbul Commerce University Faculty of Law
Istanbul Medipol University, Faculty of Law
Istanbul University, Faculty of Law, founded in 1874 and operating since 1880 consistently, currently the oldest and most prestigious law school in Turkey.
Kadir Has University, Faculty of Law
Kırıkkale University, Faculty of Law
Kocaeli University, Faculty of Law
Koç University, Faculty of Law
Marmara University, Faculty of Law
MEF University, Faculty of Law
Selçuk University, Faculty of Law
TOBB University of Economics and Technology, Faculty of Law
Yeditepe University, Faculty of Law

Education in Turkey
Turkey
Law schools
Law schools in Turkey